Torture the Artist, published as Vincent outside the US, is a novel by Joey Goebel published in 2004.

Plot summary
Vincent Spinetti is an archetypal tortured artist, a sensitive young writer who falls victim to alienation, parental neglect, poverty, depression, alcoholism, illness, nervous breakdowns and unrequited love. He is painfully unaware that these torments are due to the secret manipulations of New Renaissance, an experimental organization that is testing the age-old idea that art results from suffering. Since culture is so significantly influenced by music, movies, and television, New Renaissance hopes to improve the mindless mainstream by raising writers who emphasize artistic quality over commerce. As part of its top-secret sub-project, New Renaissance hires reluctant ex-musician Harlan Eiffler to manipulate its most promising prodigy, Vincent. Wickedly antisocial and deeply disgusted by what passes for entertainment in the twenty-first century, Harlan clandestinely pulls the strings so that Vincent remains a true artist. All the while, he poses as Vincent's manager, simultaneously nurturing his prolific career and torturing his soul.

See also 

Joey Goebel
The Anomalies

External links 
Mass-Market Martyr John Hood's Bully Magazine review of Torture the Artist
Curled Up Review
Tastes Like Chicken Review
Torture the Artist on Amazon Buy the Book online

2003 American novels